ROKS Ahn Mu (SS-085) is the second ship of s of the Republic of Korea Navy.

Development and design 
The Dosan Ahn Changho class incorporates the Korean Vertical Launching System which will be able to carry up to ten indigenous "Chonryong" land-attack cruise missiles and "Hyunmoo" submarine-launched ballistic missiles (SLBM), becoming the first submarines in the South Korean navy to have this kind of capability. They will also have many other improvements compared to their predecessors built with a greater degree of South Korean technology, especially in the later batches, which will include Samsung SDI lithium-ion batteries. Measured to displace over  submerged during sea trials, they are the largest conventional submarines ever built by South Korea.

Construction and career
Ahn Mu was laid down on 17 April 2018 at DSME, Geoje and launched on 10 November 2020.

References

Attack submarines
2020 ships
Submarines of South Korea